Ivy is the seventh studio album by Italian singer–songwriter Elisa.  It was released on 30 November 2010 in Italy. Ivy is Elisa's second acoustic album (the first being Lotus) and features 3 new songs (Nostalgia, Sometime Ago and Fresh Air), covers and acoustic reworks of her previous songs. The album was released both digitally and on CD+DVD, with the DVD containing Ivy – the Film, a documentary featuring the making-of the album as well as live performances by Elisa.

Track listing
From M & B Music blog.

Musicians
Elisa – vocals, piano
Max Gelsi – bass
Andrea Rigonat – guitar, programming
Andrea Fontana – drums, percussions
Gianluca Ballarin – organ
Simone Bertolotti – keyboards, mellotron
Rita Marcotulli – piano
Mauro Pagani – violin
Elisabetta Maineri – flute, backing vocals
Nicole Pellicani – backing vocals
Silvia Smaniotto – backing vocals

Charts and sales
The album peaked at 4 on the Italian FIMI Singles Chart. As of January 2011, the album went platinum, selling over 60.000 copies.

Release history

References

Elisa (Italian singer) albums
2010 albums